Studywiz Learning Environment, also known as Studywiz, is a virtual learning environment that includes a learning management system. Studywiz provides a platform for teachers to create, mark and share content such as tests, assignments, file resources, and embedded video and audio resources with students. StudyWiz was developed and is supported by an eponymous Australian-based company, which is part of Etech Group.

Features 
Studywiz has implemented all core facilities of a Virtual Learning Environment.  It maintains an online portfolio of academic and extracurricular achievement for each student, as well as an online storage system. It has a mobile interface for handheld devices such as the iPod. Its content is compatible with SCORM.. The system also has ClickView digital video, an activity search, an individual student blog system, discussion boards, monitored chat rooms, and a messaging system.

For instructors, the system has a student assessment marking system and tracks student attendance. There is also a login for parents.  The "Assignment" section allows teachers to upload worksheets and tasks for students to view online/download, complete, and upload. A teacher can set the due date, assessment criteria and outcomes. This can then be published to custom groups, classes, and other students, and marks can be made available to parents.  A calendar can be set up for individual students and teachers, groups, classes and for the whole school.

Studywiz Mobile 
Studywiz Mobile is the interface for Studywiz designed for portable handheld devices. It was well received by schools and won the 2009 CODiE Award for Best Mobile Software Solution.

ePortfolio 
ePortfolio is an online portfolio system built into later versions of Studywiz. It is designed to allow students to generate, store, and publish school and extracurricular achievements. From here, users can update, maintain, and export their content.

Within ePortfolio, there are Action Plans, with which students work with their teachers to set out a course of action for learning about the topics that interest them. Students then create records to store information about their achievements, add evidence (files or links to web sites) and reflections (thoughts and feedback about their achievements). A set of record templates may be created that guides students in storing and presenting their achievements. Once students have some records to work with, they create collections and add appropriate records to their collections.

Records and collections are then reviewed and verified by teachers. Once verified, collections can be published inside the Studywiz ePortfolio, published externally (with or without password protection), and exported as a set of HTML pages, PDF, or as an IMS package.

Other modules 
Studywiz also includes a number of other modular components and modular extensions including:
Mobile QT  Allows QTI assessments to be taken on mobile devices.
ClickView  Enables integration with ClickView.
eLocker Mapping  links the Studywiz eLocker with a school network.
Gmail  integrates the Gmail email system with Studywiz.
Widgit  Allows Widgit symbol system for text within Studywiz.
Mobile eLocker  Allows access to Studywiz eLocker on mobile devices in and away from school.
SMS  Sends SMS text messages through Studywiz.

References

 Mobile devices in the classroom - District Administration, Nov 2009
 Children social network in secret says Prof Byron - BBC News, Nov 23, 2009
 Etech forges global email alliance - The Sydney Morning Herald, March 2009
 School experiment leaves pupils to their own devices - The Age, January 3, 2009

External links 
 studywiz.com
 clickview.com.au
 Studywiz and iPods Improve Student Learning - Today Tonight, October 2007
 Super Schools - Today Tonight, March 2010
 Howard Middle School: 21st Education - Success Story, eSchool News, August 5, 2009

Virtual learning environments